Dragon Ball Super is a Japanese manga series written by Akira Toriyama and illustrated by Toyotarou. It is a sequel to Toriyama's original Dragon Ball and follows Son Goku and his friends as he faces even more powerful foes. After meeting the destructive deity Beerus, and attaining the power of a god, Goku ends up traveling to other universes to protect his own. Dragon Ball Super began serialization in the August 2015 issue of the monthly magazine V Jump, which was released on June 20, 2015. Its publisher Shueisha periodically collects the chapters into tankōbon volumes, with 20 published as of March 3, 2023. They also publish the series digitally in English and Spanish on their international Manga Plus app and website simultaneously as it is published in Japan. Shueisha began publishing colored versions of the Dragon Ball Super tankōbon digitally on April 3, 2020. Viz Media began posting free English translations of the chapters to their website on June 24, 2016, with a print release of the first volume following on May 2, 2017. They have published seventeen volumes in North America as of December 2022.


Volume list

Chapters not in tankōbon format

Re-releases

Digital Colored
{| class="wikitable" <th scope="row" style="text-align: center; font-weight: normal; width: 98%"
|-
! No.
! Title
! Release date
|-
| <tr style="border-bottom: 3px solid #CCF | 1
| <tr style="border-bottom: 3px solid #CCF | Warriors from Universe 6!
| <tr style="border-bottom: 3px solid #CCF | April 3, 2020
|-
| <tr style="border-bottom: 3px solid #CCF | 2
| <tr style="border-bottom: 3px solid #CCF | The Winning Universe is Decided!
| <tr style="border-bottom: 3px solid #CCF | April 3, 2020
|-
| <tr style="border-bottom: 3px solid #CCF | 3
| <tr style="border-bottom: 3px solid #CCF | The Zero Human Project
| <tr style="border-bottom: 3px solid #CCF | April 3, 2020
|-
| <tr style="border-bottom: 3px solid #CCF | 4
| <tr style="border-bottom: 3px solid #CCF | Last Chance for Hope
| <tr style="border-bottom: 3px solid #CCF | May 1, 2020
|-
| <tr style="border-bottom: 3px solid #CCF | 5
| <tr style="border-bottom: 3px solid #CCF | The Decisive Battle! Farewell, Trunks!
| <tr style="border-bottom: 3px solid #CCF | June 4, 2020
|-
| <tr style="border-bottom: 3px solid #CCF | 6
| <tr style="border-bottom: 3px solid #CCF | The Super Warriors Gather!
| <tr style="border-bottom: 3px solid #CCF | July 3, 2020
|-
| <tr style="border-bottom: 3px solid #CCF | 7
| <tr style="border-bottom: 3px solid #CCF | Universe Survival! The Tournament of Power Begins!!
| <tr style="border-bottom: 3px solid #CCF | August 4, 2020
|-
| <tr style="border-bottom: 3px solid #CCF | 8
| <tr style="border-bottom: 3px solid #CCF | Sign of Son Goku's Awakening
| <tr style="border-bottom: 3px solid #CCF | September 4, 2020
|-
| <tr style="border-bottom: 3px solid #CCF | 9
| <tr style="border-bottom: 3px solid #CCF | Battle's End and Aftermath
| <tr style="border-bottom: 3px solid #CCF | October 2, 2020
|- 
| <tr style="border-bottom: 3px solid #CCF | 10
| <tr style="border-bottom: 3px solid #CCF | Moro's Wish
| <tr style="border-bottom: 3px solid #CCF | November 4, 2020
|-
| <tr style="border-bottom: 3px solid #CCF | 11
| <tr style="border-bottom: 3px solid #CCF | Great Escape
| <tr style="border-bottom: 3px solid #CCF | December 4, 2020
|-
| <tr style="border-bottom: 3px solid #CCF | 12
| <tr style="border-bottom: 3px solid #CCF | Merus's True Identity
| <tr style="border-bottom: 3px solid #CCF | January 4, 2021
|-
| <tr style="border-bottom: 3px solid #CCF | 13
| <tr style="border-bottom: 3px solid #CCF | Battles Abound
| <tr style="border-bottom: 3px solid #CCF | February 4, 2021
|-
| <tr style="border-bottom: 3px solid #CCF | 14
| <tr style="border-bottom: 3px solid #CCF | Son Goku, Galactic Patrol Officer
| <tr style="border-bottom: 3px solid #CCF | March 4, 2021
|-
| <tr style="border-bottom: 3px solid #CCF | 15
| <tr style="border-bottom: 3px solid #CCF | Moro, Consumer of Worlds
| <tr style="border-bottom: 3px solid #CCF | April 2, 2021
|-
| <tr style="border-bottom: 3px solid #CCF | 16
| <tr style="border-bottom: 3px solid #CCF | The Universe's Greatest Warrior
| <tr style="border-bottom: 3px solid #CCF | November 4, 2021
|-
| <tr style="border-bottom: 3px solid #CCF | 17
| <tr style="border-bottom: 3px solid #CCF | God of Destruction Power
| <tr style="border-bottom: 3px solid #CCF | December 3, 2021
|-
| <tr style="border-bottom: 3px solid #CCF | 18
| <tr style="border-bottom: 3px solid #CCF | Bardock, Father of Goku
| <tr style="border-bottom: 3px solid #CCF | July 4, 2022
|}

References

Super